The 1995–96 Serie A season was the 62nd season of the Serie A, the top level of ice hockey in Italy. Nine teams participated in the league, and HC Bozen won the championship by defeating HC 24 Milan in the final.

Regular season

Playoffs

External links
 Season on hockeyarchives.info

1995–96 in Italian ice hockey
Serie A (ice hockey) seasons
Italy